Live Phish 07.15.03 was recorded live at the USANA Amphitheater in West Valley, Utah, on July 15, 2003.

This show is highlighted by a half-hour performance of the Trey Anastasio solo song "Mr. Completely," marking the first time Phish had performed the song. It would not be played again until 2017. Throughout the rest of the second set, much like their earlier days in the 1990s, the band weaves in and out of a song (this time it's "Big Black Furry Creature From Mars") in the midst of heavy improvisation and extended jams.

Other highlights include an energetic "Walls of the Cave" and a show-closing "Slave to the Traffic Light."

This show was also among a small batch of the 2003 live shows to be released in CD form.

Track listing

Disc one
 "AC/DC Bag" (Trey Anastasio) - 9:37
 "Ya Mar" (Ferguson) - 8:53
 "Theme from the Bottom" (Anastasio, Jon Fishman, Mike Gordon, Tom Marshall, Page McConnell) - 11:36
 "Saw It Again" (Anastasio, Marshall) - 7:01
 "Poor Heart" (Gordon) - 3:04
 "Two Versions of Me" (Anastasio, Marshall) - 8:00
 "Secret Smile" (Anastasio, Marshall) - 4:00
 "Mike's Song" (Gordon) - 9:26
 "I Am Hydrogen" (Anastasio, Marc Daubert, Marshall) - 3:03
 "Weekapaug Groove" (Anastasio, Fishman, Gordon, McConnell) - 12:01

Disc two
 "Mr. Completely" (Anastasio) - 30:47
 "Low Rider" (Allen, Harold Brown, Cager, Davis, DeRougemont, B.B. Dickerson, Goldstein, Jordan, Klein, Levitin, Miller, Howard E. Scott, Stone) - 3:32
 "Big Black Furry Creature from Mars" (Gordon) - 1:54
 "Buried Alive" (Anastasio) - 1:14
 "Big Black Furry Creature from Mars" (Gordon) - 0:54
 "Ha Ha Ha" (Fishman) - 0:26
 "Big Black Furry Creature from Mars" (Gordon) - 0:39
 "Mr. Completely" (Anastasio) - 5:18
 "Spread It 'Round" (Anastasio, Marshall) - 8:43

Disc three
 "Walls of the Cave" (Anastasio, Marshall) - 15:46
 "Golgi Apparatus" (Anastasio, Marshall, Szuter, Woolf) - 4:27
 "Slave to the Traffic Light" (Abrahams, Anastasio, Steve Pollak) - 11:07
 "Sleeping Monkey" (Anastasio, Marshall) - 6:30

Personnel

Trey Anastasio - guitars, lead vocals
Page McConnell - piano, organ, backing vocals
Mike Gordon - bass, backing vocals, lead vocals on "Ya Mar", "Poor Heart" and "Mike's Song"
Jon Fishman - drums, backing vocals

22
2003.07.15
2003 live albums
Elektra Records live albums